The women's 10 metre platform, also reported as highboard diving, was one of four diving events on the diving at the 1948 Summer Olympics programme.

The competition, held on Friday 6 August, was held from both 10 and 5 metre platforms and was split into two sets of dives:

Compulsory dives
Divers performed four pre-chosen dives (from different categories) – a running one-and-half somersault forward with pike, straight somersault backward (5 metre), standing straight header forward, and running straight header forward (10 metre). 
Facultative dives
Divers performed two dives of their choice (from different categories and different from the compulsory).

Fifteen divers from nine nations competed.

Results

Gudrun Grömer did not finish the competition.

References

Sources
 www.sports-reference.com
  
 

Women
1948
1948 in women's diving
Div